Mathias Thörnblom (born 14 July 1992 in Malmö) is a Swedish motorcycle speedway rider.

Career
Thörnblom made his British leagues debut in 2012 when he rode for Coventry Bees. He reached the final of the 2013 Individual Speedway Junior European Championship. and was a reserve rider at the 2013 Speedway Grand Prix.

He would return to Britain in 2015 when he rode for the Berwick Bandits during the 2015 Premier League speedway season.

In 2022, he finished fourth at the 2022 European Pairs Speedway Championship and rode in the Polish leagues for Opole.

In 2023, he left Dackarna and joined Piraterna in the Elitserien.

References

Swedish motorcycle racers
1992 births
Living people
Berwick Bandits riders
Swedish speedway riders